Terry Cooper may refer to:

 Terry Cooper (footballer, 1944–2021), English international footballer (Leeds United)
 Terry Cooper (footballer, born 1950), Welsh footballer (Lincoln City)
 Terence Cooper, actor